The Haunted World of El Superbeasto is a 2009 American adult animated superhero comedy film directed, co-written and co-produced by Rob Zombie. The film was written by Zombie and Tom Papa from Zombie's comic book series of the same name. The film was produced by Starz Media and Film Roman, with animation provided by Carbunkle Cartoons and Big Star Productions.

The film stars Papa, Sheri Moon Zombie, Paul Giamatti, Rosario Dawson, Tom Kenny, Geoffrey Lewis, Danny Trejo, Tura Satana, Clint Howard and Brian Posehn. Papa voices the character of El Superbeasto and Moon Zombie voices sidekick sister, Suzi-X.

Plot
The film follows the adventures of El Superbeasto (Tom Papa), a suave, yet violent exploitation film actor/director and former masked wrestler, and his sultry "sidekick" and sister, the super-agent Suzi-X (Sheri Moon Zombie), as they race to prevent the evil Dr. Satan (Paul Giamatti) from taking over the world by marrying the foul-mouthed stripper with the mark of the devil on her backside, Velvet Von Black (Rosario Dawson). The adventure, set in the mythic world of Monsterland, also features Murray the Robot (Brian Posehn), Suzi-X's sidekick and vehicle, based on the robot featured in the 1939 serial The Phantom Creeps starring Bela Lugosi.

Cast

Production
Work began on The Haunted World of El Superbeasto in 2006 and a release date was later scheduled for May 2007, but the film was completed in 2009. In an interview conducted on July 20, 2007 by shocktillyoudrop.com, Zombie explained that, "Nothing really much [is happening]." During that time, the film was still being animated, however, Zombie then began work on Halloween. He informed the animators that he had "to walk away because I can't split my time between two things". Zombie noted that work on The Haunted World of El Superbeasto "started when I was on Rejects and it's now just sitting on a shelf waiting for me to finish Halloween".

In a November 2007 interview with Bloody Disgusting, Zombie announced that the film was "almost finished". He went on to say that, although he was then on tour until February, "we will finally finish the music on Superbeasto and it'll be done" afterwards.

Rob Zombie had the following to say in a September 28, 2008, posting on the official El Superbeasto Myspace page: "We're down to the end! 3 long years in the making and worth every second. By Halloween this thing will be in the can completely DONE!"

According to a blog post on October 29, 2008, Defamer Magazine was privy to a "sneak peek" at scenes from The Haunted World of El Superbeasto, about which they said "it's good to know that if WALL-E falls short on its quest for Oscar gold, we now have another animated contender."

In an October 29, 2008, Blender Magazine interview, Rob Zombie stated that "I've been working on [El Superbeasto] for three years, and I'm actually in the last weeks of it — I'm mixing the sound this week. I'm not sure of the release date yet, but that'll be out probably early 2009. It's a full-length adult animated comedy." The film was screen-tested for a 2009 release by Anchor Bay Entertainment.

IGN's March 20, 2009 exclusive interview with Rob Zombie revealed that "[The Haunted World of El Superbeasto] was finished, but its release had been delayed because of ownership and legal issues within the company that made the movie, Starz Media." In that same interview, Rob Zombie described the film as "Awesome...this little tiny half-a-million dollar direct-to-video movie that expanded into this $10 million animated extravaganza. And it's awesome, but I don't have a release date yet. It's like an R-rated adult/monster/sex comedy. There's nothing really like it that I can think of. People always say like Ralph Bakshi's stuff, but...it's [more] like if SpongeBob and Scooby-Doo were filthy." The film, running feature length at 75 minutes, was released on DVD on September 22 of that year. A majority of the songs in the film are written and performed by Chris Hardwick and Mike Phirman's comedy duo Hard 'n Phirm.

Director Rob Zombie also references several other films. Tom Papa, writer and the voice of the titular character, incorporated his style of humor into his character. Throughout the film, El Superbeasto often makes observations at unusual moments, like Papa does in his stand-ups.

Reception

El Superbeasto received mixed reviews. On Rotten Tomatoes, the film has received a 40% approval rating from five critics, with an average score of 5.38/10.

References

External links
 

2009 films
2009 animated films
2000s English-language films
American adult animated films
American animated comedy films
Lucha libre
Films directed by Rob Zombie
2000s American animated films
Films scored by Tyler Bates
Films with screenplays by Rob Zombie
Film Roman films
2009 comedy films
Animated films based on comics
Films based on American comics
Films produced by Rob Zombie